A dust mask is a flexible paper pad held over the nose and mouth by elastic or rubber straps for personal comfort against non-toxic nuisance dusts.  They are not intended to provide protection from toxic airborne hazards.  The European FFP1 mask, the lowest-grade mechanical filter respirator available in the jurisdiction, is also used as a dust mask.

Dust masks are used in environments with dusts encountered during construction or cleaning activities, such as dusts from drywall, brick, wood, fiberglass, silica (from ceramic or glass production), or sweeping. A dust mask can also be worn in environments with allergens such as tree and grass pollen.  A dust mask is also used to prevent the wearer from inhaling dust or sand in a dust storm.

Description 
A dust mask is worn in the same fashion as a filtering facepiece respirator or  surgical mask, but it is dangerous to confuse them because they each protect against specific airborne dangers.  Using the wrong mask for a job can present a significant and possibly deadly danger as many dust masks with widely varied levels of protection may look similar, and even masks that do not protect against dust at all. Misfitting masks are also a danger as they allow a material to bypass the mask entirely.  A correct fit may not be as critical in masks that are intended to protect against splattering liquids or mists.  Dust masks do not protect against chemicals such as vapors and mists.  For this reason, it is dangerous to confuse dust masks with respirators used as paint masks.

Dust masks are a cheaper, lighter, and possibly more comfortable alternative to respirators, but do not provide certified respiratory protection, and may be more susceptible to misuse or poor fit. Dust masks and respirators usually do not contact the mouth, and therefore interfere less with speech than cloth masks that do contact the mouth.

Some dust masks include improvements such as having two straps behind the head (one upper and one lower), having a strip of aluminum on the outside across the bridge of the nose that can be bent for a custom fit, and having a strip of foam rubber on the inside across the bridge of the nose to ensure a better seal even if the aluminum on the outside does not fit.

Any mask that consistently covers the nose and mouth will reduce the transmission of contagious respiratory diseases. Snugly fitting dust masks generally provide more protection than loose cloth masks, but less protection than respirators.

Regulation 
Some Asian countries have regulations for dust-grade masks intended for everyday civilian use as opposed to occupational use. These include:
 China, GB/T 32610:2016 – masks for daily protection

Dust masks have been certified by the United States Bureau of Mines since the 1930s. Since 1970, the Occupational Safety and Health Administration approves dust masks, called a "filtering facepiece" in NIOSH jargon. A filtering facepiece is considered a type of respirator, and an N95 mask is a filtering facepiece, too.

See also 
 Mechanical filter (respirator)
 Nose filter

References

External links 
 

Functional masks
Safety clothing